Massimo Palombella (Turin, 25 December 1967) is an Italian Salesian priest and director of the Cappella Musicale Pontificia Sistina, succeeding Giuseppe Liberto, and before him Domenico Bartolucci and Lorenzo Perosi.

References

1967 births
Living people